William M. Brown (September 20, 1850 – January 31, 1915) was a Republican political official from Pennsylvania.

Background
Brown was born in Greenville, Pennsylvania but grew up in Iowa, where his family purchased a farm following the death of his father. In 1869, he moved to New Castle, Pennsylvania and found employment as a bookkeeper for First National Bank. He was admitted to the bar as an attorney in 1876. In 1883, Brown took a job negotiating homesteading contracts for the federal government, which required him to return for two years to Iowa. He moved back to New Castle in 1885, where he opened a department store and helped to finance the city's streetcar line. Brown was soon elected as a Republican to city council.

In 1896, Brown was elected to the Pennsylvania State Senate, serving one term from 1897 to 1899. In 1902, he was elected lieutenant governor, alongside gubernatorial candidate Samuel Pennypacker, and served from 1903 until 1907.

At the end of his term in Harrisburg, Brown returned to New Castle and invested in banking and railroad interests. In 1914 he was elected to the United States House of Representatives, but died before he was able to take office.

See also
List of members-elect of the United States House of Representatives who never took their seats

References

External links
The Political Graveyard

|-

|-

1850 births
1915 deaths
19th-century American politicians
Elected officials who died without taking their seats
Lieutenant Governors of Pennsylvania
People from Lawrence County, Pennsylvania
Republican Party Pennsylvania state senators